Danapur Railway Station or Danapur Junction, station code DNR, is a large railway station and headquarters of Danapur railway division of East Central Railway. Danapur is connected to metropolitan areas of India by the Delhi–Kolkata main line via Mughalsarai–Patna route. It is in Khagaul city about 6 km from Danapur Cantonment, in Patna district in the Indian state of Bihar.

Due to its location on the Howrah–Patna–Mughalsarai main line, many Patna and Barauni-bound express trains coming from Howrah and  stop here.

There are refreshment rooms, vegetarian and non-vegetarian food stall, tea stall, book stall, post and telegraphic office, telephone booth, Government Railway Police (GRP) office and Railway Protection Force (RPF) barracks.

Recently Danapur station has been redesigned with street art motifs on its façade, dedicated to the famous mathematician born in Bihar, Aryabhata.

Electrification 
Danapur station was electrified in March 2000 and passed the CRS inspection on 14 September 2000. Sector-wise electrification was as follows:  – Danapur between 1999–2000 and Danapur –  between 2001 and 2002.

Facilities 
The major facilities available are waiting room, free wifi from railwire, computerized reservation facility and vehicle parking. The vehicles are allowed to enter the station premises. The station also has STD/ISD/PCO telephone booth, toilets, tea stall and book stall. The Danapur station was given a new look in 2012.

Platforms 
There are 6 platforms at Danapur. The platforms are interconnected with three foot overbridge (FOB). Newly developed platform is not in sequence. It is situated in line of platform No 1 towards Patna Jn.

Construction 
East Central Railway is constructing a new platform (number 6), at an estimated cost of Rs 2.33 crore, on the southern end of the station. The work is in progress with a provision to accommodate 24 coach load combination of mail and express trains at the new platform. Under the new development plan, the railways has also decided to connect platform number 6 to platform numbers 2, 3, 4 and 5 by building a new spacious foot over bridge (FOB) at a cost of Rs 5.2 crore.

A new 92metre-long and 6metre-wide FOB is also proposed. This will connect platform #1A to the new platform (number 6), to facilitate passengers’ easy movement within the station premises. The railways is also constructing a new platform shed with 48 metre in length and 12 metre in width on platform numbers 4 and 5 to provide comforts to passengers.

The EC-Railways would also build an air conditioned waiting hall at Danapur at an estimated cost of Rs 1.57 crore.

The station has already provision for one pair of escalators and two lifts in the years to come.

Trains 
Danapur is the terminal station of several express and mail trains. Many passenger trains serve Danapur Station.

Trains that have as origin or destination Danapur station are:

Nearest airports
The nearest airports to Danapur Station are
 Lok Nayak Jayaprakash Airport, Patna 
 Birsa Munda Airport, Ranchi  
 Gaya Airport 
 Netaji Subhash Chandra Bose International Airport, Kolkata

See also 
 Ara Junction railway station
 Patliputra Junction railway station
 Phulwari Sharif railway station
 Rajendra Nagar Terminal railway station

References

External links 
 Danapur Station Map
 Official website of the Patna district
 One more platform at Danapur station soon

Railway stations in Patna
Danapur railway division